Barringtonia payensiana is a species of woody plant in the Lecythidaceae family. B. payensiana is endemic to Peninsular Malaysia (perak, selangor) and is threatened by habitat loss due to Housing & urban areas.

References

payensiana
Endemic flora of Peninsular Malaysia
Vulnerable plants
Taxonomy articles created by Polbot